"Notre Dame, Our Mother" is the alma mater (official song of devotion) of the University of Notre Dame, a private, Catholic research university in northern Indiana. The song is addressed to "Notre Dame", a reference to both the university and its patroness and namesake, the Blessed Virgin Mary. Joseph Casasanta, a 1923 Notre Dame graduate, composed the song and it was first performed at coach Knute Rockne's funeral in 1931.

The Rev. Charles O'Donnell, C.S.C., president of the university at the time of composition, wrote the song's lyrics in honor of the university's patroness, Mary, the Mother of Jesus.  Besides the usual role an alma mater plays for the school, it is part of the post-game show of the Band of the Fighting Irish and is the traditional conclusion to Notre Dame pep rallies, football games, other sporting events, and major religious services, often sung before the last hymn at Mass. When singing the alma mater, students often put their arms over each other's shoulders and sway as they sing.  This is especially common at the end of home football games.

Song notes 
 Notre Dame is French for "Our Lady" and refers to the Blessed Virgin Mary, the patroness of the school (many churches and chapels in France are dedicated to her under this name, such as the famous church in Paris, just as in Spanish-speaking countries they are dedicated to "Nuestra Señora"). The priests who founded the university in 1842 came from France;
 There is a double meaning in Notre Dame, simultaneously referring to both the school and to the Virgin Mary. Alma mater in Latin literally means "dear mother".
  Notre Dame Educational Association, Inc, a network of Notre Dame Schools in the Philippines, adopted the alma mater song "Notre Dame, Our Mother"

See also
Mother of the Church

References

External links
University of Notre Dame
Regilding the Dome
Notre Dame, Our Mother

Alma mater songs
Notre Dame Fighting Irish
American college songs
University of Notre Dame